Pholeodytes is a genus of beetles in the family Carabidae, containing the following species:

 Pholeodytes cerberus Britton, 1964
 Pholeodytes helmorei Larochelle & Lariviere, 2005
 Pholeodytes nunni Larochelle & Lariviere, 2005
 Pholeodytes palmai Larochelle & Lariviere, 2005
 Pholeodytes townsendi Britton, 1962

References

Harpalinae